Madge Tree (1875–1947) was a British actress of the silent era.

She was born in West Derby, Liverpool and died in Paddington, London.

Selected filmography
 Hard Times (1915)
 What Every Woman Knows (1917)
 The Garden of Resurrection (1919)
 The Silver Bridge (1920)
 Won by a Head (1920)
 Mary Find the Gold (1921)
 Fires of Innocence (1922)
 The House of Peril (1922)
 The Disappearance of Lady Frances Carfax (1923)
 Woman to Woman (1923)
 St. Elmo (1923)
 A Daughter of Love (1925)

References

External links

1875 births
1947 deaths
English silent film actresses
20th-century English actresses
Actresses from Liverpool
People from West Derby